This article is an incomplete list of Financial Accounting Standards Board (FASB) pronouncements, which consist of Statements of Financial Accounting Standards ("SFAS" or simply "FAS"), Statements of Financial Accounting Concepts, Interpretations, Technical Bulletins, and Staff Positions, which together presented rules and guidelines for preparing, presenting, and reporting financial statements within the United States according to generally accepted accounting principles ("GAAP") in the United States Of America, of which this list made up a substantial part.

The SFAS have been superseded by the FASB Accounting Standards Codification (ASC). The codification is effective for interim and annual periods ending after September 15, 2009. All existing accounting standards documents are superseded by the ASC. All other accounting literature not included in the Codification is now deemed nonauthoritative.

Statements of Financial Accounting Standards
Statements of Financial Accounting Standards have been superseded by the Accounting Standards Codification, effective for periods ending after September 15, 2009. The below table lists the Statements of Financial Accounting Standards that were issued prior to the Codification.

Statements of Financial Accounting Concepts
Statements of Financial Accounting Concepts are a part of the FASB conceptual framework project. They set fundamental objectives and concepts that FASB will use in developing future U.S. generally accepted accounting principles (GAAP), however, they are not a part of the US GAAP. To date, 8 Concept Statements have been issued.  See Statements at the FASB website for more information.

List of FASB Interpretations

FASB Interpretations extend or explain existing standards (primarily Statements of Financial Accounting Standards), and are considered part of U.S. Generally accepted accounting principles. As of September 2006, 48 interpretations have been published.

External links
 List of all FASB Pronouncements, including full text, status

United States Generally Accepted Accounting Principles
Financial Accounting Standards Board